Marine Quiniou (born 26 August 1993) is a French professional racing cyclist, who most recently rode for UCI Women's Continental Team .

References

External links
 

1993 births
Living people
French female cyclists
Sportspeople from Quimper
Cyclists from Brittany
20th-century French women
21st-century French women